Shannondale is an unincorporated community in Montgomery and Boone counties, in the U.S. state of Indiana.

History
Shannondale was platted by Isaiah Lame and George Woods in 1851. Nathan Shannon was an early postmaster. A post office was established at Shannondale in 1852, and remained in operation until it was discontinued in 1909.

Geography

References

Unincorporated communities in Montgomery County, Indiana
Unincorporated communities in Boone County, Indiana
Unincorporated communities in Indiana